ACiD Productions (ACiD) is a digital art group. Founded in 1990, the group originally specialized in ANSI artwork for BBSes. More recently, they have extended their reach into other graphical media and computer software development. During the BBS-era, their biggest competitor was iCE Advertisements.

History 
ACiD Productions was founded in 1990 as ANSI Creators in Demand by five members: RaD Man, Shadow Demon, Grimm, The Beholder, and Phantom. Their work originally concentrated in ANSI and ASCII art, but the group later branched out into other artistic media such as tracker music, demo coding, and multimedia software development (e.g., image viewers).  Membership rose from five members in 1990 to well over seven hundred by 2003.

In the mid-1990s, ACiD created subsidiary groups responsible for these broader areas.  For example, Remorse is the official ACiD sub-label responsible for ASCII art and other text-based graphics.  Similarly, pHluid is responsible for module tracking and music production, and ACiDic handles bulletin board software modification and enhancement.

Following the post dial-up BBS era, ACiD focused largely on the preservation of digital art history, talk radio news, the sale of their DVD-based artscene archives, and sponsorship of demoparties.

In 2008, the San Francisco gallery 20 goto 10 featured an exhibit of ACiD artists Somms and Lord Jazz.

In 2013, members from ACiD collaborated with 21st century ANSI art collective Blocktronics to produce "Blocktronics ACiD Trip", a scrolling ANSI measuring  lines tall.  This ANSI artwork debuted at Demosplash at Carnegie Mellon University where it was awarded first place in the ANSI and ASCII category.

Works 
ACiD has produced a variety of well-received works and services. A select list follows:

Demos
 "Out of Sight, Out of Mind"

Image viewers
 ACiD View
 SimpleXB
 RemorseView

Image editors
 ACiDDraw
 Empathy
 PabloDraw

Metadata protocols and binary image standard
 SAUCE
 XBin

Music disks 
 pHluid

Disk magazines
 The Product
 Lancelot II
 ACiDnews

Radio programming
 The ARTS (news/talk radio)
 pHluid Radio (music)
 ACiD Radio (music)

See also
 Aces of ANSI Art (<A.A.A>)
 ANSI art
 ASCII art
 List of artscene groups
 List of text editors (ASCII art section)

References

External links 

 

Artscene groups
Bulletin board systems
Tracker musicians
American artist groups and collectives
Arts organizations established in 1990
Computer-related introductions in 1990
Internet properties established in 1990
1990 establishments in the United States